N'Dri Philippe Koffi (born 9 March 2002) is an Ivorian professional footballer who plays as a winger for French  club Le Mans on loan from Reims.

Club career
Koffi began playing football at the youth academy of Coulaines, and had stint with the youth teams at Le Mans and Laval before joining Reims on 9 July 2019. He made his professional debut with Reims in a 2–0 Ligue 1 win over Rennes on 12 September 2021, scoring his side's second goal in the 67th minute.

On 28 January 2022, Koffi was loaned to Paços de Ferreira in Portugal. On 11 August 2022, he returned to Paços de Ferreira on a new loan.

On 31 January 2023, Koffi moved on a new loan to Le Mans in Championnat National.

References

External links
 
 Stade de Reims Profile
 

2002 births
Footballers from Abidjan
Living people
Ivorian footballers
Association football wingers
Stade de Reims players
F.C. Paços de Ferreira players
Le Mans FC players
Ligue 1 players
Championnat National 2 players
Primeira Liga players
Ivorian expatriate footballers
Ivorian expatriate sportspeople in France
Expatriate footballers in France
Ivorian expatriate sportspeople in Portugal
Expatriate footballers in Portugal